Craig Healy (born: 9 September 1957) is a sailor from San Pablo, California, United States. who represented his country at the 2000 Summer Olympics in Sydney, Australia as crew member in the Soling. With helmsman Jeff Madrigali and fellow crew member Hartwell Jordan they took the 9th place.

References

1957 births
Living people
North American Champions Soling
Olympic sailors of the United States
People from San Pablo, California
Sailors at the 2000 Summer Olympics – Soling
Soling class world champions
American male sailors (sport)